XHQB-FM is a radio station in Tulancingo, Hidalgo, broadcasting on 97.1 FM. It is owned by Grupo Miled.

History
XHQB began as XEQB-AM 1340, which received its concession on June 26, 1970. It was owned by Oscar Bravo Santos and broadcast with 250 watts. The station was later sold to Radio Tulancingo, S.A., which remained in the Bravo family, and upgraded to 1 kW.

In 2011, XEQB was cleared to migrate to FM. In 2015, the concession was transferred to Miled.

References

Radio stations in Hidalgo (state)
Radio stations established in 1970